Anselm of Havelberg (c. 1100 – 1158) was a German bishop and statesman, and a secular and religious ambassador to Constantinople. He was a Premonstratensian, a defender of his order and a critic of the monastic life of his time, and a theorist of Christian history. According to Friedrich Heer, "the peculiar course of Anselm's life made this much-travelled man the theologian of development, of progress, of the right of novelty in the Church".

Life
Anselm's birthplace is uncertain. He was a pupil of Norbert of Xanten at Laon, and then was appointed to the Bishopric of Havelberg in the Northern March. Because Havelberg was then controlled by the Polabian Slavs, Anselm's provisional seat was in Jerichow. He served as papal legate and overall commander of the 1147 Wendish Crusade. After Havelberg was recovered by the Saxons during the campaign, cathedral construction was begun.

Anselm was sent by Lothair III, Holy Roman Emperor, to Constantinople in 1136. in the hope of a Byzantine alliance. He held theological discussions with Nicetas of Nicomedia, an account of which he wrote later as his Dialogues, at the request of Pope Eugenius III. His account tended to play down the theological differences, including the filioque clause, 
but was more stark on the political issues. A later encounter with Basil of Achrida in 1154 proved fruitless.

He lived in a time where there was a growth in the diversity of religious orders, in his first book the Dialogues (c. 1149), unlike those who were scandalized by the novelty of these new orders, he saw these orders as part of God's plan for the renewal of the church. In his Dialogues, he mentions "They devise for themselves a new [way] of psalmody; they establish new ways of abstinence and measures of food; and follow neither the monks who fight under the rule of Benedict nor Augustine".

Anselm also served as Archbishop of Ravenna from 1155-8. He died in Milan.

Works
Anselm's works include De ordine canonicorum regularium, Apologeticum pro ordine canonicorum regularium, and the three Dialogi (Greek title Antikeimenon), in the Patrologia Latina.

Notes

References
Dialogues/Anselme de Havelberg (1966, Paris: Les editions du Cerf)
Carol Neel, Philip of Harvengt and Anselm of Havelberg: The Premonstratensian Vision of Time, Church History, Vol. 62, No. 4 (Dec., 1993), pp. 483–493
Jay T. Lees (1998) Anselm of Havelberg: deeds into words in the twelfth century
Sebastian Sigler (2005), Anselm von Havelberg: Beiträge zum Lebensbild eines Politikers, Theologen und königlichen Gesandten im 12. Jahrhundert

External links
http://www.sources-chretiennes.mom.fr/ 
Katholische Kirche zwischen Prignitz und Havelland 
PDF Anselm von Havelberg — Diplomat, Bischof, Theologe 

1100s births
1158 deaths
12th-century German Roman Catholic bishops
Premonstratensians
People of the Northern Crusades
Christians of the Wendish Crusade
Diplomats of the Holy See
Archbishops of Ravenna
12th-century Italian Roman Catholic archbishops
Ambassadors to the Byzantine Empire